Festa may refer to:

Feast day for a Christian saint, in Italian, Portuguese, Galician, and Maltese
Festa della Repubblica, the Italian National Day and Republic Day

Music
Festa (album), by Ivete Sangalo, or the title song, 2001
"Festa" (song), by MAX, 2003

People
Alberto Festa (born 1939), Portuguese footballer
Chris Festa (born 1985), American race car driver
Costanzo Festa (1495–1545), Italian composer
Gianluca Festa (born 1969), Italian football manager
Gianluca Festa (politician) (born 1974), Italian politician and basketball player
Giorgio Festa (1860-1940), Italian physician
Marco Festa (born 1992), Italian footballer
Matthew Festa (born 1993), American baseball player
Mike Festa (born 1954), American lawyer
Paul Festa, American writer and filmmaker
Sebastiano Festa (1490-1524), Italian composer

See also